Hiroshi Saitō may refer to:

Sports 

, Japanese basketball player
, Japanese rower
, Japanese modern pentathlete
, Japanese footballer

Politicians 

, Japanese diplomat
, Japanese politician from Tokorozawa, Saitama Prefecture
, Japanese politician from Yamagata, Yamagata Prefecture

Other uses 

, Japanese mathematician

See also 
Hiroshi